Frank Hyde MBE OAM (7 February 1916 – 24 September 2007) was an Australian rugby league footballer, coach and radio caller. A New South Wales representative three-quarter, Hyde played his club football in Sydney for NSWRFL Premiership clubs Newtown, Balmain (with whom he won the 1939 Premiership) and North Sydney. Following his playing career, Hyde enjoyed even greater success as a commentator, earning him Membership of the Order of the British Empire and a place in the Sport Australia Hall of Fame and the Australian Commercial Radio Industry Hall of Fame.
Hyde's contribution to Rugby League is celebrated each year with the Frank Hyde Shield, a three match tournament played between the Newtown Jets and North Sydney Bears.

Playing career
Born Francis Patrick Aloysius Hyde in 1916, he grew up in inner-city Sydney in The Rocks. Residential rules of the time required him to play for the Balmain club, but he preferred to play with Newtown and managed two seasons there before the rule was enforced upon him.

During his playing career, Hyde represented the Newtown Bluebags, (now Newtown Jets), the Balmain Tigers, the North Sydney Bears and, at the state level, New South Wales. He scored a try for the Balmain Tigers in their winning grand final of 1939, and was captain-coach of the North Sydney Bears when they reached the grand final in 1943 when defeated by Frank Farrell's Newtown. However, due to World War II, he was unable to represent the Australian national team.
Frank Hyde married Gaby Schofield at Waverley in 1942. He retired as a player-coach in 1944. He returned to coach Norths for one last year in 1950.

Media career
Hyde began his career as a broadcaster in 1953 and found immediate success as a Rugby League commentator. His renowned call, accompanying a shot for goal, of "It's long enough, it's high enough and it's straight between the posts" became an iconic part of the game.
 He broadcast 33 consecutive New South Wales Rugby League Grand finals from the Sydney Cricket Ground between 1953 and 1983 (including the replays of 1977 and 1978) on Sydney radio station 2SM from which he became famous. He also was a Rugby League journalist at the Fairfax Press for many years.

For many years, Hyde was a regular on Sydney television, mainly appearing with  Ron Casey (Sydney broadcaster) on the World Of Sport - a weekend Rugby League program on the Nine Network.

Recording Career

During the 1970s, Hyde recorded 3 albums: Frank Hyde Sings, The Frank Hyde Party Sing-a-long and Frank Hyde Sings For The Good Times. 

His famous rendition of the Irish classic Danny Boy, with Try a Little Kindness as the B Side were released in 1973 and peaked at number 69 on the Kent Music Report.

Albums discography

Honours and awards
On 1 January 1974, at the age of 57, Hyde was made a Member of Order of the British Empire.

On 26 January 1990, Hyde was awarded the Medal of the Order Of Australia (OAM) for services to Rugby League Football and the media.

On 24 October 2000, at the age of 84, Hyde was awarded the Australian Sports Medal for his service to the game of rugby league as player, coach and broadcaster.

The Frank Hyde Shield is contested on an annual basis between the Newtown and North Sydney clubs.

In 2006,  Hyde was inducted into the Australian Commercial Radio Industry Hall of Fame.

Family 
Children:
Gregory Francis Hyde (born 1943)
Anne Elizabeth Hyde (born 1945)
Michael James Hyde (born 1948)
Margaret Mary Hyde (born 1948)
Maria Linda Hyde (born 1955)
Patrick Joseph Aloysius Hyde (born 1959)

Death
Frank Hyde outlived his wife Gaby by seven months, and died on 24 September 2007 at the age of 91.  He was survived by his 6 children, 6 grandchildren and 6 great-grandchildren. He was honoured at the 2007 NRL Grand final with a video-tribute during the half time break of the match between the Manly-Warringah Sea Eagles and Melbourne Storm and a minute's silence prior to the Premier League Grand Final.

Notes

References

Further reading

External links
 
 ABC-PM tribute to Frank Hyde. (transcript and audio)
 Frank Hyde at rl1908.com
 Frank Hyde article at menofleague.com

1916 births
2007 deaths
Australian rugby league commentators
Balmain Tigers players
Members of the Order of the British Empire
Newtown Jets players
North Sydney Bears coaches
North Sydney Bears players
Recipients of the Australian Sports Medal
Recipients of the Medal of the Order of Australia
Rugby league players from Sydney
Sport Australia Hall of Fame inductees